Anton Yuryevich Morozov (Russian: Антон Юрьевич Морозов; born 24 February 1972), is a Russian politician who has previously been a member of the State Duma from the Liberal Democratic Party of Russia (LDPR).

Biography

Anton Morozov was born in Moscow on 24 February 1972.

In 1995, he graduated from the Faculty of Physics of Moscow State University.

Morozov had been a member of the Novgorod Oblast Duma from 2006 to 2011

On 6 April 2016, Morozov became a member of the State Duma of the sixth convocation, as he received the mandate of Sergey Sirotkin, which had been vacant. He is a member of the International Affairs Committee.

On 18 September 2016, he was elected to the State Duma of the VII convocation on the federal list from the Liberal Democratic Party (No. 1 in the regional group No. 95, Novgorod Region, Tver Region).

He was a member of the Supreme Council of the LDPR, elected at the XXX Congress of the LDPR on 4 February 2017.

References

1972 births
Living people
Liberal Democratic Party of Russia politicians
Politicians from Moscow
Sixth convocation members of the State Duma (Russian Federation)
Seventh convocation members of the State Duma (Russian Federation)
Moscow State University alumni